Amvrosy is a Russian Christian male first name. It is derived from Greek ambrosios, meaning (belonging to) immortal(s), god-like; cf. ambrosia, food of gods. Abrosim is a colloquial variant of this first name. Other variants include colloquial and Old Church Slavonic Ambrosy; additional colloquial variants include Afrosim, Ofrosim, Abrosy, Avrosim, Obrosim, Ambros, Abros, and Obros. The diminutives of "Amvrosy" include Abrosya, Amvroska, and Rosya.

The patronymics derived from "Amvrosy" are ""/"" (Amvrosiyevich/Amvrosyevich; masculine) and ""/"" (Amvrosiyevna/Amvrosyevna; feminine). The patronymics derived from "Abrosim" are "" (Abrosimovich; masculine) and its colloquial form "" (Abrosimych), and "" (Abrosimovna; feminine).

See also
Ambrose (given name)
Ambrož (disambiguation)
Ambrose of Optina (Amvrosy Optinsky) (1812–1891), Russian monk canonized by the Russian Orthodox Church

References

Notes

Sources
Н. А. Петровский (N. A. Petrovsky). "Словарь русских личных имён" (Dictionary of Russian First Names). ООО Издательство "АСТ". Москва, 2005. 
[1] А. В. Суперанская (A. V. Superanskaya). "Современный словарь личных имён: Сравнение. Происхождение. Написание" (Modern Dictionary of First Names: Comparison. Origins. Spelling). Айрис-пресс. Москва, 2005. 
[2] А. В. Суперанская (A. V. Superanskaya). "Словарь русских имён" (Dictionary of Russian Names). Издательство Эксмо. Москва, 2005. 

